Point O'Woods or Point O' Woods may refer to
Point O'Woods Golf & Country Club
Point O' Woods, New York